Red Wharf Bay and Benllech railway station was the terminus station of the Red Wharf Bay branch line, which ran between Holland Arms and Benllech, off the Anglesey Central Railway.

History
The original plan had been to build the station 0.1 mile from Red Wharf Bay, but the final plans saw it built half a mile south of nearby Benllech. The goods yard to the east of the platform contained three sidings and a loop. The approach to the station, from the south, was the site of the only signal on the line. Soon after the completion of the line a local businessman opened up a limestone quarry with the intention of transporting the produce via the new station.

The station was closed in 1930 and the track taken up in 1953. Most of the buildings were demolished at around that time, although the main station building itself still exists.
There is now nothing existing on the site other than a few artefacts from the original demolition. The site was used as a storage facility for a number of years, but is now a wood yard.

References

Further reading

Disused railway stations in Anglesey
Railway stations in Great Britain opened in 1909
Railway stations in Great Britain closed in 1930
Llanfair-Mathafarn-Eithaf
Former London and North Western Railway stations
1909 establishments in Wales
1930 disestablishments in Wales